Barilius borneensis is a fish species in the family Cyprinidae. Its taxonomic validity is unclear as it might be a junior synonym of Opsarius koratensis.

Distribution and ecology
Barilius borneensis is found in western Borneo, Indonesia. It is a benthopelagic freshwater fish that can reach a length of about  SL.

Common names
The common names of the Barilius borneesis are as follows:
Czech: Parmička západobornejská
Mandarin Chinese (simplified): 博尔尼低线鱲
Mandarin Chinese (traditional): 博爾尼低線鱲

References 

borneesis
Endemic fauna of Borneo
Endemic fauna of Indonesia
Freshwater fish of Indonesia
Fish described in 1989